North of a Miracle is the debut solo album by English singer-songwriter Nick Heyward. It was released on 28 October 1983 through Arista Records and spent 10 weeks on the UK Albums Chart, peaking at number 10.

The album produced four UK singles, "Whistle Down the Wind", "Take That Situation", "Blue Hat for a Blue Day" and "On a Sunday".

In the United States, the album peaked in the Billboard 200 at number 178 and remained on the chart for 4 weeks. On the Cash Box album chart, it spent a total of eight weeks, peaking at number 170. The single "Whistle Down the Wind" peaked at No. 20 on the Billboard Adult Contemporary chart in early 1984 and was selected by director John Hughes for inclusion in the 1984 film Sixteen Candles.

Recording and production
The album was recorded from May to June 1983 at Abbey Road Studios and produced by Geoff Emerick. The original U.S. vinyl pressing significantly altered the running order of the songs, with only 3 songs (1, 2 & 6) maintaining their original positions.

Track listing

U.S. track listing 

(Note: all U.S. track timings listed as slightly shorter on original U.S. LP labels – Arista AL 8 8106)

Remastered track listing (2010)
A 2-disc remastered version of the album was released in 2010 on Cherry Red Records.

Personnel
Credits are adapted from the album's liner notes.

 Nick Heyward – record producer, vocals, electric guitar, acoustic guitar, brass arrangements
 Pete Beachill – trombone
 Stuart Brooks – flugelhorn, trumpet
 Andrew Brown – bass guitar
 Paul Buckmaster – string arrangements
 Brian Gascoigne – piano
 Ian Laws – guitar
 Bill Le Sage – piano
 Tony Maronie – bongo drum, percussion
 Dave Mattacks – drums
 Steve Nieve – organ, piano
 Pino Palladino – bass guitar
 Morris Pert – marimba, percussion
 Andrew Powell – conductor, orchestral arrangements
 Tim Renwick – electric guitar, acoustic guitar, mandolin
 Danny Schogger – accordion, organ, piano
 Chris White – saxophone

Production
 Geoff Emerick – record producer, engineer
 Jon Jacobs – assistant engineer
 David Botterell – photography, management

References

External links
 
 

1983 debut albums
Nick Heyward albums
Albums arranged by Paul Buckmaster
Arista Records albums
Albums produced by Geoff Emerick